The Gheluvelt Plateau actions, July–August 1917 took place from 31 July to 27 August, during the Third Battle of Ypres (31 July – 10 November 1917) in Belgium, in the First World War. The British Fifth Army and the German 4th Army fought for possession of the plateau at the highest part of the ridges to the south-east, east and north-east of Ypres in West Flanders. The 4th Army had been building defensive positions in the Ypres Salient since 1915 and the Gheluvelt Plateau was the most fortified section of the front. The Fifth Army had made the plateau its main objective during the Battle of Pilckem Ridge (31 July – 2 August) but the II Corps advance was contained short of its objectives and German counter-attacks later recaptured some ground.

The ground had been churned by artillery-fire and beginning late on 31 July, torrential rains lasted until 5 August, turning the ground into a sea of mud and flooded shell craters. An attack by II Corps on 2 August, postponed to 10 August, led to the Capture of Westhoek but Inverness Copse, Glencorse Wood and Nonne Bosschen were re-captured by German counter-attacks. The German defensive success was costly even with new tactics and began to concern German commanders. In a dry spell, the Fifth Army attacked again at the Battle of Langemarck  but II Corps was again repulsed by counter-attacks of the German ground-holding divisions and their supporting  (specialist counter-attack) divisions. The Royal Flying Corps flew more battlefield reconnaissance and ground attack sorties but a German hasty counter-attack overran a brigade of the 56th (1/1st London) Division, leaving British troops further north outflanked, forcing them to retreat.

On 22 August, the 14th (Light) Division captured Inverness Copse and then lost it to a German methodical counter-attack on 24 August. A tank–infantry attack failed on 27 August, when the tanks bogged down and another attempt was cancelled on 31 August. The sodden ground hampered all movement, made tank operations almost impossible and smothered shell explosions. Low cloud and fog obstructed communication between the front line and rear, impeding liaison between British artillery and their observation aircraft. Despite considerable tactical refinements by the British, the German defenders, who had to endure the same exhausting and morale-sapping conditions, held on at Inverness Copse and Glencorse Wood. British morale fell so low that some men were taken prisoner without a fight; the Germans found them bitter over their failures but the success of the 4th Army was costly in casualties.

After 24 August, Field Marshal Sir Douglas Haig, the British Expeditionary Force (BEF) commander, moved the Fifth Army–Second Army boundary again, this time northwards to the Ypres–Roulers railway and relieved II Corps with the I Anzac Corps and X Corps. After a three-week lull to improve communications, during which the rains stopped and the ground dried, the British captured much of the Plateau on 20 September, during the Battle of the Menin Road Ridge (20–26 September). In 1929, John Charteris, the BEF head of intelligence from 1915 to 1918, wrote contradictory remarks about the August climate in Flanders, which influenced later writers. The official historian, James Edmonds rebutted Charteris in 1948 and also criticised Gough, despite including much contrary evidence. In 1996, Prior and Wilson wrote that Gough had planned attritional "bite and hold" operations, rather than attempts to break through the German defences, contrary to claims by many other writers, including the official historian.

Background

Topography

Ypres is overlooked from the south-west by Kemmelberg (Kemmel Hill) and from the east by low hills running south-west to north-east, with Wytschaete (Wijtschate) and Hill 60 to the south of Verbrandenmolen, Hooge, Polygon Wood and Passchendaele (Passendale). The rises are slight, apart from the vicinity of Zonnebeke, which has a gradient of  From Hooge and to the east, the slope is  near Hollebeke, it is  height variations are subtle and resemble a saucer lip around the city. Further south is the muddy valley of the Douve river, Ploegsteert Wood (Plugstreet to the British) and Hill 63. West of Messines Ridge is the parallel Wulverghem (Spanbroekmolen) Spur, with the Oosttaverne Spur, also parallel, further to the east. The general aspect south and east of Ypres is one of low ridges and dips, gradually flattening northwards beyond Passchendaele into a featureless plain.

Possession of the higher ground to the south and east of Ypres gave the Germans easy observation, plenty of opportunities for enfilade fire and converging artillery bombardments. The 4th Army could also move artillery, reinforcements, supplies and stores in dead ground. The ridge had woods from Wytschaete to Zonnebeke giving good cover, some being of notable size like Polygon Wood and those named Battle Wood, Shrewsbury Forest and Sanctuary Wood by the British. Roads in this area were unpaved, except for the main ones from Ypres, with occasional villages and houses along them. In 1914, the lowland west of the ridge had been a mixture of meadow and fields, with high hedgerows dotted with trees, cut by streams and ditches emptying into canals. The main road to Ypres from Poperinghe to Vlamertinge is in a defile, easily observed from the ridge.

Strategic developments

Only two US divisions had arrived in France by late August but the mutinies in the French armies after the Nivelle Offensive had abated. The Second Battle of Verdun, in support of the offensive in Flanders, had been delayed from mid-July, which forfeited strategic surprise. German artillery frequently bombarded French positions with the new mustard gas and several spoiling attacks disrupted French preparations. On 20 August, the French attacked on an  front and recaptured Mort Homme and Hill 304, taking  for the loss of   them killed or missing. The 5th Army was not able to deliver large counter-attacks, because its  divisions had been transferred to Flanders; local operations continued into November. On the Eastern Front, the Kerensky Offensive  had been defeated by the Central Powers; the Russian armies began to disintegrate and Germany and Austria-Hungary were able to reinforce other fronts. In the south, the Italian army began the Eleventh Battle of the Isonzo on 17 August and captured the Bainsizza Plateau, leading the Austro-Hungarians to appeal for German help; a French offensive in Greece on the Salonika front was repulsed.

Tactical developments

Battle of Messines

Field Marshal Sir Douglas Haig, commander of the British Expeditionary Force intended to exploit success in the Second Army (General Herbert Plumer) attack on the Messines–Wytschaete Ridge on 7 June, by gaining a foothold on the Gheluvelt Plateau as a preliminary to the main offensive out of the Ypres Salient. Plumer wanted three days to transfer  guns and howitzers northwards from Messines Ridge. On 6 June, the day before the Messines attack, the Fifth Army commander, General Hubert Gough, had told Haig that he preferred to wait until the Northern Operation, the main offensive out of the Ypres Salient or to have command of the II and VIII corps attack. On 8 June, both corps sent patrols forward which reported determined resistance, prompting Haig to ask Plumer to begin the attack at once. Plumer wanted to wait for the artillery to arrive and Haig transferred command of the II and VIII corps to the Fifth Army.

Haig ordered Gough to conduct a limited attack with the two corps but Gough reported that a success would put the British in a "very exposed and difficult salient" and that it would be better to conduct the attack with the main offensive. (Field Marshal) Rupprecht, Crown Prince of Bavaria, the commander of Army Group Rupprecht of Bavaria on the northern part of the Western Front, thought that the British success on 7 June foreshadowed an attack against the 4th Army to capture the higher ground between Gheluvelt and Zandvoorde in the north and Comines on the Lys (Leie) river, south of Messines Ridge. In late June, Rupprecht expected the British to conduct battering-ram attacks on narrow fronts, with overwhelming artillery-fire, to drive wedges into the defences of the 4th Army and deplete German reserves, preparatory to an advance out of the Ypres Salient on a broad front ( "breakthrough attack launched on a broad basis").

Peripheral operations

Between the end of the Battle of Messines and the Battle of Pilckem Ridge at Ypres beginning on 31 July, operations against Lens and Lille were to be made by the First Army in late June. Offensive operations were planned near Gavrelle and Oppy, along the Souchez River against a German salient between Avion and the west end of Lens, the capture of Reservoir Hill (Hill 65) south of Lens and an attack by the Canadian Corps on Hill 70, at the northern outskirts of Lens. Three of the Canadian divisions captured the hill, inflicted many casualties on five divisions of the German 6th Army and pinned down troops reserved for the relief of tired divisions on the Flanders front.

Prelude

German preparations

Fortifications

The 4th Army (General Friedrich Bertram Sixt von Armin) was responsible for defence of the Western Front from Lille to the North Sea, which included the Ypres Salient. In early 1917, German corps had been renamed  based on a corps headquarters, with fresh divisions coming under command as tired ones were withdrawn, rather than the traditional permanent establishment of divisions. The IX Reserve Corps became  and held  of the front south of the Menin road northwards, with three ground holding divisions in the front line and three  (specialist counter-attack) divisions in reserve. The III Bavarian Corps was renamed  and held  of front from the Menin road north to the Gheluvelt Plateau and Pilckem, with three  and two  divisions. The  divisions were kept out of sight behind the Menin and Passchendaele ridges. About  further back were four more  divisions and  beyond were another two divisions in army group reserve.

Since early 1917, there had three German defensive positions behind the front position. The  ran from Bixschoote in the north, southwards behind Pilckem Ridge and across the Gheluvelt Plateau. The  began at Langemarck, ran south to Gravenstafel then crossed the Gheluvelt Plateau to Zandvoorde to the east of Messines Ridge. The  (Flanders Position),built earlier in the year, ran along Passchendaele Ridge and across the Gheluvelt Plateau behind Polygon Wood, west of Becelaere, across the Menin road and south to the Lys river. Because of the flat ground and high water table, hundreds of pillboxes and blockhouses, rather than deep dugouts, had been built above ground and camouflaged with mud and turf. The many stone farmhouses dotted around had also been fortified; from two to forty men could be accommodated in the concrete and steel shelters, immune to anything smaller than a hit by an 8-inch shell.

Loßberg rejected a withdrawal and ordered that the front line be held rigidly.

On 30 June, Kuhl suggested a withdrawal to  along Passchendaele Ridge, joining with the old front line near Langemarck to the north and Armentières in the south. A withdrawal would avoid a hasty retreat from Pilckem Ridge and force the British into a time-consuming redeployment. Loßberg disagreed, because the British would launch a broad front attack, making a local withdrawal pointless; the ground east of the  line was easy to defend, the Menin Road Ridge could be held and Pilckem Ridge deprived the British of ground observation over the Steenbeek valley, while German observation of the area from Passchendaele Ridge allowed infantry to be supported by observed artillery fire.

Infantry organisation
The 4th Army operation order for the defensive battle was issued on 27 June.

The failures at Verdun in December 1916 and at Arras in April 1917, had given more importance to these areas, since the  had been overrun during both offensives and the garrisons lost.

Loßberg rejected elastic defence as a tactic in Flanders, because there was little prospect of operational pauses between British attacks given that the British had so much artillery and ammunition. A trench garrison which retired, quickly became disorganised and could not counter-attack, losing the sector and leaving the flanks of neighbouring formations in the air. Loßberg ordered that the front line was be fought for at all costs, with immediate counter-attacks to recapture lost sectors.

Front line troops were not expected to cling to shelters but leave them as soon as the battle began, moving forward and to the flanks, to avoid artillery-fire and to counter-attack. German infantry equipment had recently been improved by the arrival of  machine-guns (tactical equivalent of the British Lewis gun) per regiment.

British preparations

By mid-1917, plans for infantry attacks were determined by the artillery support that could be provided. Commanders planned attacks to create the conditions for success in the absence of voice communication and attacks were limited to the range of artillery covering fire. Infantry units were to follow a creeping barrage, pausing at intermediate objectives to reorganise behind standing barrages and then dig in on the final objective, behind a protective barrage. In February 1917, infantry units were organised and equipped on a standard pattern and trained to achieve their objectives so that each man knew what to do and the drills to follow in certain circumstances. SS 143 (Instructions for the training of Platoons for Offensive Action) prescribed a platoon organisation of four sections, the Lewis gun and rifle-grenade sections for firepower and the rifle and bombing sections for manoeuvre. The platoon was to seek opportunities for flank attacks and to use initiative rather than refer back for orders. The new infantry platoon organisation and training gave infantry the capacity to succeed despite casualties to officers and NCOs and sometimes after losing the creeping barrage.

Divisions organised attacks according to SS 135 (Instructions for the training of Platoons for Offensive Action) of December 1916. The pamphlet was derived from the experience of the Somme in 1916 for divisions to organise according to a common pattern and prescribed the siege warfare methods necessary for trench-to-trench attacks, the semi-open fighting, when defensive positions had been captured and open warfare techniques, for when the defence collapsed. All the sections of SS 135 addressed the problem of command when no voice communication existed by prescribing that a commander's intention must be communicated and that the infantry should make every effort to send back information by any means available, primarily by visual methods which needed specialist parties to advance with the infantry to set up relay stations, carrier pigeons, experimental wireless sets, power buzzers, signal lamps and runners, who were trained to use the terrain and know the trench systems for maximum protection.

Davidson memorandum

In late June, Brigadier-General John Davidson, the head of the Operations Branch, BG(O), at GHQ, wrote a memorandum criticising some aspects of the Fifth Army plan for "ambiguity as to what was meant by a step-by-step attack with limited objectives". Destructive artillery fire on the smaller area of attack would be of correspondingly greater density and a closer objective would make a better jumping-off line for the next advance. The German tactic of immediate counter-attack would be easier to defeat when the British infantry were organised and relatively fresh, the artillery was ready and communications established, rather than in an isolated position further forward. Davidson wrote that a series of such attacks would be needed, before the demoralisation of the defenders would make more ambitious tactics feasible. Gough replied to Davidson that the extent of the preparations for the attack justified a more optimistic plan,

The Fifth Army plan emphasised that information should quickly be communicated back to headquarters and that troops should be independent within the plan, to achieve a high tempo of operations (the rate or rhythm of activity relative to the enemy) rather than lose time waiting for orders. On 27 June, Haig agreed to widen the II Corps frontage, to attack Tower Hamlets, a cluster of pillboxes at the top of the Bassevillebeek Spur opposite the right flank, which was an obvious base for a German counter-attack into the right flank of II Corps. Haig arranged through the Fifth Army HQ for II Corps to take over the 24th Division and artillery from the Second Army, extending the southern flank of the II Corps to the Klein Zillebeke–Zandvoorde road on 4 July. After meeting with Gough and Plumer on 28 June, Haig endorsed the Fifth Army plan but emphasised that the main battle would be for the Gheluvelt Plateau and the plan should reflect this. An advance in the north should depend on the capture and consolidation of the plateau, after which an advance along the main ridge to Broodseinde could begin.

The Fifth Army Intelligence summary of 7 July described the elaborate defences on the Gheluvelt Plateau, noted that most new fortifications were being added to the plateau compared to the flanks and that much of the German artillery was placed to support the defenders on the plateau. The summary contained a prediction that the Germans would pivot on the Gheluvelt Plateau if they were pushed back over the Steenbeek further north. Summaries on 14, 17 and 21 July, reported that the German field artillery west of the Steenbeek had been withdrawn  behind the front line and that the assembly areas for  divisions were behind the Gheluvelt Plateau and Passchendaele Ridge. In the Fifth Army operation order issued on 27 June, the green line (third objective) was made the main objective, where a protective barrage would fall for one hour after the infantry were scheduled to arrive. After the protective barrage finished, patrols of fresh troops were to move forward to reconnoitre and occupy tactically valuable ground not occupied by the Germans, up to the fourth objective (red line).

II Corps plan

The II Corps was to advance successively on a  front to the blue, black and green objective lines, about  forward. The green line was  ahead on the right flank of the 24th Division at Klein Zillibeke in the south, to  along the Ypres–Roulers railway, the left flank of the 8th Division (Major-General William Heneker) in the north. Local advances could be made towards the red line (fourth objective)  further on, by patrols from the reserve brigades at the discretion of divisional commanders, depending on the state of the German defenders beyond the green line. The preliminary bombardment was intended to destroy German strong-points and trenches, cut barbed wire and counter-battery fire was to suppress German artillery during the attack. The infantry would advance behind a creeping barrage moving at  every four minutes, followed by infantry in columns or artillery formation. The II Tank Brigade, Tank Corps was to attack the plateau with  followed by  attack the third objective and eight more to advance on the fourth objective with four supply tanks following.

Much of the German field artillery on the plateau was hidden in the remains of the woods or behind the plateau, safe from ground observation. The Germans were expected to counter-attack quickly on the plateau, given the vital importance of its commanding ground to both sides. The 22 July operation order for the 8th Division specified that "if the opportunity arises", an attempt would be made to advance to the red line along the Broodseinde Ridge. The rest of the division was in corps reserve, ready to advance beyond the red line if needed.

 
On 10 July, Heneker wrote that the 8th Division attack depended on the success of the 30th Division (Major-General Weir de Lancey Williams) on the right (south). If the 30th Division failed to reach its objectives, an advance by the 8th Division beyond the second objective would be vulnerable to enfilade fire from Stirling Castle north to Polygon Wood. The 30th Division had the most difficult task in II Corps, yet had not recovered from its losses earlier in the year. Too late, GHQ suggested using a fresher division but to reduce the burden, two battalions of the 89th Brigade and two of the 53rd Brigade of the 18th (Eastern) Division were added the 30th Division. The extra battalions were to advance from the second to the third objective, with the 54th Brigade ready to continue the advance if the third objective fell.

Battle

31 July

II Corps faced Reserve Infantry Regiment 82 on the right flank of the 22nd Reserve Division from Klein Zillebeke to Lower Star Post in Shrewsbury Forest, the 6th Bavarian Reserve Division from Lower Star Post northwards to Westhoek and Infantry Regiment 95 of the 38th Division from Westhoek to the Ypres–Roulers railway. The 6th Bavarian Reserve Division had been in the front line since 15 July and had suffered many casualties during the British bombardment and began to be relieved by the 52nd Reserve Division on the night of  The outpost garrisons of Bavarian Reserve Infantry  either side of the Menin road at Hooge, had been reduced by half against the risk of mine explosions, after the disaster on 7 June during the Battle of Messines.

All three brigades of the 24th Division attacked to create a defensive flank along the south-west of the Gheluvelt Plateau, across the dip of the Bassevillebeek stream from south of the Klein Zillebeke–Zandvoorde road in the east to the Menin road on the west. The 73rd Brigade, in the centre, had to advance through Shrewsbury Forest but was stopped by fire from German pillboxes at Lower Star Post, on a slight rise in the middle of a clearing. The German garrison held out supported by covering fire from machine-gun posts further back; the 73rd Brigade advance was stopped and the 17th Brigade was forced to retire to a line about  short of the second objective. The 72nd Brigade on the left flank reached the Bassevillebeek stream below the Bassevillebeek (Tower Hamlets) Spur but was fired on from Dumbarton Wood on the left flank and withdrew to a line south from Bodmin Copse, several hundred yards short of the first objective. (Torrential rain fell during the night and troops of the 73rd Brigade discovered that the Germans had retired from Lower Star Post and occupied the position early on 1 August.)

The 21st Brigade on the right could not emerge from assembly dugouts on time because of a German bombardment and reached the start line after the barrage had begun to creep forward. The infantry were overburdened and the two leading battalions failed to catch up through the wreckage of tree stumps shell craters and barbed wire in Sanctuary Wood. As the British reached the eastern edge of the wood they were engaged by German machine-gunners in pillboxes on Stirling Castle Ridge  further on. a slow and costly advance began across the devastated ground and the support battalions, which should have advanced to the second objective, also became involved in the attack, which took until  to capture the ridge,  being captured in the remains of the castle.  By the time the ridge was captured, the creeping barrage was on the far side of the Bassevillebeek valley and all attempts to advance down the forward slope were costly failures in the face of German machine-gun fire from camouflaged emplacements on the far side. The brigade dug in roughly on the first objective from Bodmin Copse north to Stirling Castle.

On the left flank, the 90th Brigade made a slow advance in the dark, the left flank battalion veering northwards into Château Wood and reporting mistakenly that it had captured its objectives in Glencorse Wood. At  the German artillery began to bombard Sanctuary and Château woods, which cut communications with the rear. Telephone lines were cut, wireless sets were damaged, power buzzers were useless in the wet ground and the bad light made visual signalling very difficult. At  an aircraft on contact patrol had reported that it received small-arms fire from Inverness Copse and that no British troops could be seen. Runners took hours to traverse the heavy going and it took until  for reports to arrive.

By Williams suspected that the advance had stalled and Lee managed to cancel the advance of the 54th Brigade from the third to the fourth objective but two 89th Brigade battalions and two 53rd Brigade battalions from the 18th (Eastern) Division, which should have made the advance from the second to the third objective, had already advanced. The four battalions were slowed by the barrage on Sanctuary Wood and reached the first objective at  having suffered casualties crossing the wood. The creeping barrage had already reached the third objective and attempts to press on without the barrage down the forward slope of the Bassevillebeek valley and the neck of the plateau further north, failed. The British infantry became so mixed up that troops from eight battalions ended up in dug outs on the Menin road at Clapham Junction.

The support battalion of Reserve Infantry Regiment 239 had sheltered in a tunnel west of Inverness Copse and then blew it when the British attack began. Williams ordered an attack at  but an hour earlier, II Corps had ordered that the ground gained should be consolidated and the attack was cancelled.

In the 8th Division advance towards Westhoek, Bellewaarde Lake was taken by a converging attack along the spurs either side, while the banks were bombarded by mortars firing thermite bombs. As the troops advanced further, through the obstacles of Château Wood, they struggled to keep up with the creeping barrage to the first objective, the east side of Bellewaarde Ridge. The new front line could not be held south of Westhoek and the 24th Brigade and the right flank of the 23rd Brigade fell back about  behind Westhoek Ridge. The line of shell-holes was held with great difficulty against massed small-arms fire. By  the attack by II Corps had been stopped and Jacob reported this to the Fifth Army HQ. Determined German counter-attacks by a battalion of Reserve Infantry Regiment 41 and by Infantry Regiment 95 to recapture Westhoek Ridge, were made at  The Germans gained a footing before the 25th Brigade recaptured the ground and was then withdrawn behind Bellewaarde Ridge in immediate reserve, with the 23rd and 24th brigades holding the new line. The infantry of the German 38th Division had conducted well-timed counter-attacks, in accord with the latest thinking about tactical manoeuvre.

Air operations

Operations by the Royal Flying Corps (RFC) to deprive the Germans of air observation over the attack front had been curtailed because of the poor weather on 29 and 30 July. On 31 July, dull weather and cloud at  stopped the air operation planned in support of the ground offensive. The RFC managed  sorties by aircraft from corps squadrons, giving some information about the progress of the ground battle and observers reported that the infantry had failed to light flares when called on. Pilots flew lower to see the uniforms of the troops and  the aircraft returned with damage from by bullets and shells. After taking such risks, some of the reconnaissance reports dropped at special reporting centres did not arrive at corps HQs but other reports were acted on, promptly to alter the bombardment.

Small numbers of aircraft from army squadrons were sent out to seek targets of opportunity and had some local effect. Troops marching along roads, in villages and woods, supply columns, staff cars, machine-gun nests, artillery batteries and aircraft caught in the open on airfields were strafed from very low altitude. The  made a maximum effort despite the weather and its airmen were able to report the position of the front line, also descending to identify soldiers' uniforms. Aircraft attacked British troops on the battlefield and reconnaissance aircrews saw that British reserves were not moving forward but poor light made photographic reconnaissance impossible.

Tank operations

The advance of the tanks was hampered by the decision not to conduct a preliminary attack to capture the ground east of Sanctuary Wood and the woods nearby, for tank assembly areas. The 30th Division failed to capture a huge blockhouse to the north-east of Clapham Junction, from which the Germans commanded the Menin road to Hooge. Several attempts to destroy it with heavy artillery had failed and as tanks drove down the Menin road,  hit by an anti-tank gun in the blockhouse.

Some tanks drove along the edges of Dumbarton Wood, Inverness Copse and Glencorse Wood, destroyed machine-gun nests and dispersed German troops assembling to counter-attack. The tank crews could not hit camouflaged, low, concrete emplacements built with ground-level loopholes, through which the German machine-gunners fired and forced the British infantry to ground. Eight tanks to attack the fourth objective were in the third echelon but only one tank got into action, joining in the fighting between the first and second objectives. Of the  tanks attached to II Corps,  or broke down and  into action and caused the Germans many casualties but all were knocked out that day. (Gun Carrier Mark Is, the first self-propelled artillery could carry a 60-pounder gun or a 6-inch howitzer and made their début on 31 July.)

1–9 August

After II Corps reported that it was close to the second objective, Gough ordered another attack on 2 August and then altered the order, to make certain that the second objective had been captured before the Fifth Army attacked again. On 1 August, Davidson recommended that the attack by II Corps should not be rushed but start after two to three days of clear weather, to exploit the observation points and the two maps captured on 31 July. The maps showed the positions of camouflaged pillboxes and Davidson argued that fresh divisions should be used because it was vital for II Corps to secure the Gheluvelt Plateau. The Fifth Army corps commanders agreed that taking the area from Inverness Copse to Westhoek would not be enough because the priority given to the defence of the plateau by the German 4th Army, meant that a big counter-attack to restore the front line must be expected. On the evening of 31 July, Rupprecht had made a diary entry,

 (sic) announced that

The German commanders were anxious about the effect on German infantry of the fighting in Flanders but troops transferred to the 4th Army had been trained in the new defensive tactics developed in 1916 and revised after the Battle of Arras. Divisions arriving in Flanders were confident that their training, equipment and tactics could defeat the Allies.

The banks of streams had been smashed by artillery-fire and became bogs with few places to cross, all of whom were easily visible to the Germans and frequently bombarded, especially on the Gheluvelt Plateau. The consolidation of captured ground was retarded and troops who deviated from the tracks could drown.

On 2 August, Gough agreed that tanks would not be used again until a dry spell and on 2 August, the resumption of the offensive was postponed. On 4 August it stopped raining and 5 August was dull, stormy and sunless, with no drying wind and yet more rain forecast. On 3 August, Rupprecht wrote in his diary that German troops were quickly being exhausted by the conditions and divisions had suffered about  during a period in the line, unlike on the Somme in 1916, when 14-day tours had cost divisions an average wastage of  Shorter periods in the front line enabled troops to recover faster but the frequent British gas bombardments made it difficult to get supplies forward; carrying parties of the 6th Bavarian Reserve Division had suffered  casualties.

Capture of Westhoek

The power of the German artillery behind the Gheluvelt Plateau after 31 July was undiminished and a continuous bombardment fell on the front line and rear areas of II Corps. The counter-battery artillery of the Fifth Army fired on German artillery positions along the width of the army front, ready for the general attack due after the II Corps operation on the Gheluvelt Plateau. The British guns often bombarded the wrong artillery positions because of a lack of air reconnaissance to track the moves of German artillery from one artillery position to another in the bad weather. The British failed to achieve artillery superiority over the German artillery behind the plateau, which made the completion of new battery positions a long and costly effort that took until 8 August. Casualties in men and guns were so high that on 4 August, many British batteries were reduced to half strength. The state of the ground was so bad that gunners had to live in shell holes. New plank roads to carry ammunition forward could easily be seen by German artillery observers and wagon drivers and carrying parties moved only at night, dodging German bombardments which frequently included mustard gas. Amidst the rain and mud, the delivery of supplies and the passage of troops across the beaten zone extremely dangerous and caused a constant drain of casualties.

The 30th Division was relieved by the 55th and 54th brigades of the 18th (Eastern) Division on 4 August. The 24th Division, not due to attack, remained in the line and took over the front northwards close to Stirling Castle to narrow the attack frontage of the 18th (Eastern) Division. The fresh divisions had to remain close to the front for more than a week before zero hour and were rapidly exhausted by the conditions. The speed of the barrage gave the 18th (Eastern) Division  and the 25th Division  to complete the attack.

10 August

The defenders of Reserve Infantry Regiment 239 were capable of little resistance and many surrendered. The attacking battalion of the 55th Brigade that had advanced to the east side of Inverness Copse was vulnerable to attack from the south, because the right hand company, which had to form a defensive flank along the southern edge, had been stopped on its jumping-off line by machine-gun fire from a strongpoint at the south-west corner of the Copse. In the moonlight at  German sentries had seen the company and its support company crossing Stirling Castle Ridge to the start line. Both companies had been severely depleted by artillery and machine-gun fire before the attack. Just after  German field guns and machine-guns began to barrage the British start line from Stirling Castle north to Westhoek and cut off the British infantry from supplies and reinforcements. The German support battalions began immediate counter-attacks into the Copse and the British were forced back through the north end. The Germans retook the western edge and the blockhouse at the north-western corner; British attempts to recapture the Copse failed.

The two battalions on the 54th Brigade front captured their objectives with fewer losses and occupied the  pillboxes either side of FitzClarence Farm and along the track through Glencorse Wood, from which they repulsed the German . The troops remained isolated by the German box barrage and needed reinforcements as their casualties increased during the day. The other two battalions of the brigade had held the front line for the last ten days and were exhausted but when the brigade commander asked for the 53rd Brigade to move closer at  Lee refused, to avoid crowding the area under bombardment, keeping the brigade available to take over the front line for the night. Reserve Infantry Regiment 238 and Reserve Infantry Regiment 6, the  regiment of the  9th Reserve Division from Reutel, advanced behind a smokescreen into the wood and made a flanking attack from Inverness Copse. The British were forced back to their start line on the right but managed to hold the north-west corner of the wood.

The outposts of Reserve Infantry Regiment 90, 54th Division, in the front line since  were captured by  but on the right flank a blockhouse garrison held out until attacked under a bombardment by Stokes mortars. German artillery-fire continued all day; sniping and attacks by German aircraft on troops in the open caused many more losses. Contact with the rear was maintained all day using signal lamps; the five field artillery brigades responded quickly to calls for covering fire and dispersed German troops assembling for counter-attacks. As German troops reoccupied Glencorse Wood, snipers and machine-gunners were able to obstruct consolidation, particularly on the right flank; it was impossible to dig a continuous front line trench or communication trenches to the rear.

The 7th Brigade was in reserve and sent a battalion to reinforce the right flank and one forward to Westhoek Ridge in close reserve. The Germans attempted to make several counter-attacks into the night but all bar one were dispersed by artillery-fire. When a SOS rocket went unseen in the smoke at  another counter-attack was defeated by infantry small-arms fire, rifle-fire being found to be particularly effective. Casualties were  killed,  and more than  missing; the right-hand battalion had  At  Jacob ordered the front line to be consolidated and for the 53rd Brigade, in the 18th (Eastern) Division area, to recapture Glencorse Wood as soon as possible. The attack was postponed for  because of the weather, the condition of the ground and one of the relieving battalions going north of the Menin road instead of east. The artillery opened fire but the infantry advance was cancelled in time; the postponed attack was later called off.

11–15 August

The front battalion commander of Reserve Infantry Regiment 239 had been captured on 10 August and said that the men had been so demoralised by their casualties from 31 July to 9 August, that he had reported that they could not hold their ground. The commanders of the 54th and 55th brigades in the attack of the 18th (Eastern) Division wrote that the artillery arrangements against a counter-attack had been inadequate and that one RFC aircraft for counter-attack reconnaissance was insufficient. On 12 August, Heneker asked that Nonne Bosschen and Glencorse Wood be captured as a preliminary, to avoid casualties like those of 31 July and that the artillery for 56th (1/1st London) Division should be reinforced. The sloping ground from the Menin road down to the Hanebeek Valley meant that if the attack on the southern flank failed, the 8th Division would again suffer enfilade-fire from the higher ground on the right flank. The suggestion was rejected but the day before the attack, the 53rd Brigade from the 18th (Eastern) Division was attached to the 56th (1/1st London) Division as a reinforcement.

On 12 August, Jacob asked for a delay in the general offensive due on 14 August, to allow time to capture the Gheluvelt Plateau at least as far as the 10 August objectives. The British had still not gained artillery superiority over the German guns beyond the plateau, which were destroying the tracks through Sanctuary and Château woods, interrupting the delivery of supplies and ammunition needed for the next attack. The eight divisions in corps reserve had been committed and the two in Fifth Army reserve had also been used, the 56th (1/1st London) Division joining II Corps on 6 August, along with the 47th (1/2nd London) Division and the 14th (Light) Division from the Second Army, by 15 August. Gough was constrained by Operation Hush needing the high tides due at the end of the month; if they were missed it would be four weeks before the next high tides. The Fifth Army offensive was postponed for a day but after a thunderstorm and downpour late on 14 August, Gough ordered another postponement until 16 August.

Battle of Langemarck

The divisions were to set up a defensive flank facing south towards Inverness Copse, with eight strong points from Black Watch Corner at the south-west corner of Polygon Wood back to Stirling Castle. On 12 and 14 August, Brigadier-General Higginson reported that the casualties of the 53rd Brigade from  had been so severe, that the brigade was incapable of reaching its objective. On 15 August, a tired battalion from the 54th Brigade and a fresh one from the 168th Brigade, 56th (1/1st London) Division reserve, were attached to form the defensive flank.

The eight machine-gun companies of the 56th (1/1st London) Division and the 8th Division formed two groups, to fire overhead barrages on the objective and from south-west of Zonnebeke to the north-east corner of Polygon Wood. The 52nd Reserve Division, opposite the 56th (1/1st London) Division, was relieved by the 34th Division on the night of  a battalion of Infantry Regiment 145 took over in Glencorse Wood and Nonne Bosschen on the right and a battalion of Infantry Regiment 67 relieved the defenders of Inverness Copse and Herenthage Park, either side of the Menin road.

16 August

German SOS flares rose into the sky but the artillery reply was too late and missed most of the attacking waves, except in the 56th Division area on the right, which lost many men in the leading companies to German artillery firing from the south-east; the advance of the two 53rd Brigade battalions to form the southern defensive flank was delayed. The rest of the composite brigade pressed on but was stopped by massed machine-gun fire from inside Inverness Copse, particularly from three machine-guns in the pillbox at the north-west corner, which had a wide field of fire. Machine-gun fire was also received from FitzClarence Farm in the open between the Copse and Glencorse Wood; a second attempt by the support companies failed. A shoot by heavy artillery on the pillbox from  the night before, had mistakenly not been fired and the preliminary bombardment by  had no effect. Part of the brigade managed to work forward further north and formed the defensive flank along the southern edge of Glencorse Wood.

In the centre, the 169th Brigade advanced quickly at the start but veered to the right to avoid boggy ground, then entered Glencorse Wood. The defenders were overrun after a mutually costly engagement and the intermediate objective, a line of pillboxes in the sunken road inside the wood, was captured. After a pause, the support battalions leapfrogged the intermediate line and pressed on through more boggy ground, against greater opposition and delays caused by German machine-gunners firing from old artillery positions. The troops lost the barrage but a few parties reached the final objective in the  pillboxes in Polygon Wood and northwards, along Anzac Farm spur to the vicinity of Iron Cross Redoubt.

The brigade went round to the left, which caused a gap between the 167th and 169th brigades. The quick start had been partly due to the rear waves pushing up to avoid German shelling on the left of the brigade. The supporting infantry got mixed up with the foremost troops and failed to mop up captured ground or German troops who had been overrun and begun sniping from behind. Part of a company reached the area north of Polygon Wood, at about the same time as small numbers of troops from the 8th Division, attacking to the north. The ground in the 56th (1/1st London) Division area was so bad that none of the tanks in support got into action. A protective barrage fired in front of the intermediate objective failed to prevent Infantry Regiment 145 penetrating gaps and surrounding the four battalions of the 167th Brigade by  A German creeping barrage followed by infantry rolled over the surrounded battalions, whose survivors collected behind the sunken track in Glencorse Wood and the west side of Nonne Bosschen. Machine-gunners of the 9th London Battalion managed to stop the German advance and when news of the German attack reached the 167th Brigade HQ, the plan to form the southern defensive flank was cancelled.

On the 8th Division front, the two attacking brigades started well, advancing behind an "admirable" barrage and reached the Hanebeek stream, where hand bridges were used to cross for the advance to continue up Anzac Spur to the green line objectives on the ridge beyond. Difficulties began on the left flank, where the advance of the 16th (Irish) Division was stopped near Potsdam Redoubt, which freed German machine-gunners north of the railway to enfilade the area of 8th Division to the south. On the right flank, the 56th (1/1st London) Division advance was stopped by fire from German strong points and pillboxes and from German artillery concentrated to the south-east. The 8th Division eventually captured Iron Cross, Anzac and Zonnebeke redoubts on the rise beyond the Hanebeek, then sent parties over the ridge. German troops who recaptured machine-gun posts at the north end of Nonne Bosschen fired on the 25th Brigade troops digging in on Anzac Farm Spur, as Heneker had predicted.

German troops, seen arriving in lorries behind the German front line, advanced over Anzac Spur at  Smoke-shells in the German barrage obscured British SOS rockets and despite the good visibility, only a vague warning was delivered by an RFC aircraft on counter-attack reconnaissance. Other German guns placed a barrage from Stirling Castle to Westhoek for the rest of the day, which intensified at noon and prevented British carrying parties from taking food and ammunition forward. The British artillery did not open fire until  by when the 25th Brigade, already enfiladed from the right, had been frontally attacked and forced back to the Hanebeek, with many casualties. As the 25th Brigade fell back, the right of the 23rd Brigade was exposed and enveloped by the Germans, forcing the brigade retreated to avoid being rolled up. The British troops became disorganised but managed to hold the ground west of the Hanebeek, a few hundred yards forward of the start-line, with the northernmost battalion further forward, where the Hanebeek flowed beneath the Ypres–Roulers railway.

Reserve Infantry Regiment 90 had been resting around Becelaere and was sent back to Glencorse Wood and Nonne Bosschen to reinforce Infantry Regiment 145. At  the Germans counter-attacked from Polygon Wood and forced the remnants of the 169th Brigade out of the sunken track and back to the start-line at the west end of the wood. The 167th Brigade fell back as its southern flank was exposed and about  infantry tried to exploit their success but British SOS flares were seen by the artillery which smothered the attack, inflicting many losses. By evening, German enfilade-fire led to the 8th Division brigades being ordered to retire close to their start-line. In a diary entry, Rupprecht wrote that  had been suffered by Army Group Prince Rupprecht from 1 June to 10 August and that it was impossible for the 4th Army to conduct more than small attacks to improve their positions; Langemarck could not be recaptured.

17–19 August

On 17 March, Gough told a conference that an attack to capture the objectives not attained on 16 August, would take place on 25 August and that II Corps was to capture Inverness Copse on 22 August as a preliminary; the weather on 17 and 18 August was good with a drying wind. Reports from the brigade commanders of the 56th (1/1st London) Division criticised a lack of time to prepare for the attack and suggested that fresh troops ought to keep close to the foremost troops to consolidate objectives as soon as they were captured. The protective barrage fired in front of the objective had been unsatisfactory because many of the shells were fitted with Fuze 106 were ineffective when falling on soft ground and waterlogged shell-holes.

The division edged forwards into the sparsely-garrisoned German outpost line opposite and improved the front line as a jumping-off point for the next attack; the 25th Division took over on 3 September. On 19 August, an intelligence summary estimated that the Germans had  between Zandvoorde, Gheluvelt and Zonnebeke.

Inverness Copse

22–23 August

By late August, Inverness Copse on the north side of the Menin road and Herenthage Park to the south, were held by troops of Infantry Regiment 67 in shell-hole positions along the western fringe of the Copse. The  ran along eastern edge of the Copse but the defences on the west side, about  forward, were a vital outpost line. The capture of the decline to the east would provide the British with valuable observation posts for the next advance. The line was to follow the eastern fringe of Inverness Copse north of the Menin road and further on to FitzClarence Farm; on the left (northern) flank, the 42nd Brigade was to capture the blockhouses along the sunken road in Glencorse Wood.

The 43rd Brigade attacked with the 6th Duke of Cornwall's Light Infantry (6th DCLI) on the right and the 6th Somerset Light Infantry (6th SLI) on the left. The 6th SLI got into Inverness Copse with few losses and began a bayonet and hand grenade fight with the 5th Company of II Battalion, IR 67. The 7th Company on the left was also forced back by the 6th SLI and around  the SLI reached the château south of the Menin road and took  in a  advance. As the 5th Company had been forced back, the left flank of the 6th Company north of the Menin road, was left in the air and the commander covered the gap with machine-guns.

The 6th DCLI was caught within  of its jumping-off line by machine-gun fire from Inverness Copse, forced under cover and lost the barrage. One of four tanks supporting the attack arrived along the Menin road, turned north at the edge of the Copse and engaged the pillboxes pinning down the DCLI, then drove close to a trench along the north edge of the Copse, machine-gunning the German defenders, forcing them out. The 8th Company arrived from the  but could not stop the tank, despite losing many men rushing it and throwing grenades. The survivors retreated until a field gun was brought up to the south end of Polygon Wood and opened fire, forcing the tank to withdraw. The 6th DCLI was able to use the distraction to move up another  but was still far short of its objective, leaving the 6th SLI isolated.

Orders for another counter-attack were sent from the 34th Division HQ but arrived too late and the attack had to be postponed.

The bombardment was not fired and the infantry advanced on time against a determined defence (the 6th SLI and the 6th DCLI had been relieved during the night by the 6th King's Own Yorkshire Light Infantry (6th KOYLI) and the 10th DLI), through which the Germans claimed to have penetrated  to the western edge of the Copse. The German infantry were forced back to their start-line by machine-gun fire from the tanks but after about thirty minutes, German artillery knocked one out; the second tank had engine-trouble and the crew were killed as they dismounted.

After five minutes, the guns were to lift the barrage  and maintain it for an hour to isolate the British from reinforcements; aircraft were to strafe the British front line.

24 August

The German hurricane bombardment preceding the  began at  fell short of the British along the western fringe of the Copse and hit the German positions instead. It was too late to contact the artillery and the German infantry began the advance at  but the  lift by the artillery fell correspondingly short. The British counter-attacked at  but were held up by the arrival of another company of IR 177. The short shooting by the German artillery continued and at  a message was sent back that the infantry would have to retire unless it stopped. The firing continued and the Germans retreated from the western edge of the Copse. The British 43rd Brigade were mixed up and the 9th Rifle Brigade (a battalion), on loan from the 42nd Brigade had also arrived. The British brigade commander wanted to exploit the German retirement but at noon, the commanders at the front reported that they lacked sufficient men to conduct the attack and to hold their positions if it failed.

The panic abated but a counter-attack by two fresh battalions was called off because of the confused state of the front line.

25–31 August

On 25 August, British artillery blew up an ammunition dump near the blockhouse of the commander of the German support battalion of the Hooge sector. British shelling of the target forced the BTK to abandon the headquarters and the front line battalion commander did the same before his bunker was destroyed the next day. A general attack by the Fifth Army due on 25 August was cancelled and heavy rain fell during the night of  before a phased attack planned for the next day. The 23rd Division (Major-General James Babington) relieved the 14th (Light) Division on 26 August, except for the 41st Brigade, which came under command. Two battalions of the 70th Brigade were attached to the 41st Brigade and the rest of the 23rd Division went into reserve positions. During the morning the Germans advanced behind a creeping barrage and attacked four outposts with flamethrowers and captured three. At  on 27 August (the corps to the north having attacked at ), four tanks were to advance, each with two infantry platoons, to capture  of the trench from the Menin road along Inverness Copse to Glencorse Wood. The tanks ditched close to the front line around Clapham Junction and few of the infantry reached their objectives; those that did were killed or forced to retreat. Next day, the 41st Brigade was replaced by the 70th Brigade; rain and gales led Haig to cancel Fifth Army attacks, except by II Corps on the Gheluvelt Plateau; the weather continued so bad that the next attack on the plateau was called off on 31 August.

Aftermath

Analysis

31 July

In the History of the Great War volume Military Operations France and Belgium 1917, Part II (1948) James Edmonds, the British official historian, described a meeting on 27 June between Haig and Jacob. Haig decided to reinforce II Corps in the Fifth Army by transferring the 24th Division and artillery from X Corps on the northern boundary of the Second Army to the southern boundary of the Fifth Army. Edmonds also described Haig meeting the army commanders the day after on 28 June but the meetings were transposed in the narrative. At the 28 June conference to discuss the memorandum written by Davidson, the Fifth Army plan was endorsed but Edmonds wrote that the emphasis Haig placed on the capture of the Gheluvelt Plateau reflected the GHQ plan, rather than the Fifth Army scheme. In the text, Edmonds wrote that Gough spread the attacking divisions evenly, when he could have reinforced the II Corps with divisions from the corps to the north.

The Fifth Army Operation Order of 27 June was reproduced in Appendix XIII of the official history, showing that the green line (third objective) was the line on which the Fifth Army was to consolidate. The red line determined the furthest extent that exploitation of local opportunities beyond the green line could be undertaken on local initiative. Advance guards of all arms, from the reserve brigades of the attacking divisions or the divisions in corps reserve, were to advance beyond the green line after the protective barrage ended, to reconnoitre and to occupy undefended ground and tactically valuable features up to the red line. The order emphasised that several organised battles on a wide front would be necessary to defeat the Germans and that quick reorganisation would be needed after each attack, contrary to later accounts that described the plan as a breakthrough attempt,

In 2007, Jack Sheldon wrote that the daily report of the 4th Army claimed that the Allied attack had been a costly failure, which Sheldon called hyperbole. The attackers had advanced  and overrun two defensive positions; heavy artillery had severely bombarded German  moving behind the front line. The defenders had made powerful and determined counter-attacks and the defensive success on the plateau compromised British advances further north, which were vulnerable to enfilade fire by small arms from the plateau and observed artillery-fire. The capture of the Gheluvelt Plateau would have to be a slow process of preparatory bombardments and limited advances. British and French commanders considered the attack to be the first of a series of blows which would lead to an inevitable German collapse and German commanders were concerned at the demands that the battle made on their troops.

August

The Fifth Army needed to maintain a brisk tempo of attack to benefit from German disorganisation and to create the conditions for Operation Hush on the coast. Hush had to begin during the high tide period at the end of August or it would have to be postponed until the end of September. The Fifth Army had captured ground on the Gheluvelt Plateau on 31 July but the unusually wet and murky weather, the tenacious German defence and determined counter-attacks, left the 4th Army in control of the most vital objectives around Inverness Copse and Glencorse Wood. II Corps attacked the Gheluvelt Plateau on 10, 16, 22 and 27 August. The Germans conducted local counter-attacks with reserve units of the ground-holding divisions and made a bigger, methodical counter-attack on 24 August to recapture Inverness Copse. Haig cancelled a general attack intended for 25 August and altered the Fifth Army–Second Army boundary for the third time. The Second Army took over the II Corps front on the Gheluvelt Plateau in early September and Plumer was allowed three weeks to prepare the next attack.

The II Corps operations on the Gheluvelt Plateau from 31 July to 31 August were conducted by the 24th, 30th, 8th, 25th, 14th, 47th (1/2nd London) and 56th (1/1st London) divisions. From 25 June to 31 August, the II Corps artillery fired more than  shells. All of the II Corps divisions suffered many casualties and the torrential rains created exhausting conditions for the infantry. Edmonds wrote in 1948 that the costly failure to capture the plateau in August depressed British morale lower than ever before. The experience among the survivors, recounted in Britain by wounded troops, made a greater impression than the run of victories in September and early October. The French had been left "unmolested" and the Germans postponed plans for an offensive against the Russians. Edmonds quoted from Ludendorff (My War Memoirs, 1919) that

In 1996, Robin Prior and Trevor Wilson wrote that changes in Fifth Army infantry tactics had no effect on the lack of accurate artillery firepower necessary to get infantry through the German defences without prohibitive casualties, then keep them there against German artillery-fire and infantry counter-attacks. After the German re-capture of Inverness Copse on 24 August, Haig made the Second Army responsible for the Gheluvelt Plateau, preparatory to a new attack on both sides of the Menin road. The Fifth Army continued with local attacks and by 27 August was worn out. In 2004, John Lee wrote that the weather in August was the worst for  but despite the conditions, Gough continued to order attacks which were inevitably defeated, causing a "severe loss of morale" among the British infantry.

In 2008, J. P. Harris wrote that the August rain fell on both sides but that it benefited the defenders, because it made observation from the air harder, a greater disadvantage to the British and French, who had far more guns than the Germans. Mud stopped movement and the Germans were trying to hold ground, rather than attack like their opponents. The II Corps attack scheduled for 2 August had several postponements, until 10 August, when fresh divisions made a limited objective attack. The ground was still waterlogged, British counter-battery fire failed to suppress the German guns and the attack was a costly failure at the most vital point. By late August, confidence in the handling of the battle by the Fifth Army HQ at GHQ and among the corps and divisional staffs had diminished but intelligence reports continued to be optimistic about the pressure being applied to the Germans. Harris wrote that  despite his "endemic optimism", Haig transferred control of the battle for the Gheluvelt Plateau to Plumer but let Fifth Army operations continue in the interim, then ordered them to stop after a series of "bloody failures" that caused a further loss of confidence in Gough.

R. A. Perry wrote in 2014 that by the end of August, thirty German divisions had fought at Ypres, two of them twice and 23 had been exhausted and replaced but that this could be misleading, since at full strength, German divisions had an establishment of  rather than the  a British division. The British had used  two twice, of which  been withdrawn. Including the four French divisions of the First Army;  divisions with an establishment of  had engaged  divisions with an establishment of  Nine of the German divisions had been transferred from Champagne and Alsace-Lorraine, easing the pressure on the French armies.

Weather

In Field Marshal Earl Haig (1929), Brigadier-General John Charteris, the BEF Chief of Intelligence from 1915 to 1918, wrote that

the first part of his sentence was quoted by Lloyd George (1934), Liddell Hart (1934) and Leon Wolff (1959); in a 1997 essay, John Hussey called the passage by Charteris "baffling". The BEF had set up a Meteorological Section under Ernest Gold in 1915, which by the end of 1917 had  and  The section predicted the warm weather and thunderstorms of 7 to 14 June and in a letter to the press of 17 January 1958, Gold wrote that the facts of the Flanders climate contradicted the claim made by Charteris in 1929. In 1989, Philip Griffiths examined August weather in Flanders for the thirty years before 1916 and found that,

It was obvious to the Fifth Army HQ planners that moving so many troops, animals, wheeled vehicles, stores and thousands of tons of ammunition, would cut up the ground in the salient. With the experience of August weather since 1914 and study of French records, it was reasonable to hope that the relatively small amount of rain in August would dry quickly and that mud would bake. In August 1917,  of rain fell,  of it on   the weather was also overcast and windless, which much reduced evaporation. Hussey wrote that the weather that August was exceptionally bad; Haig had been justified in his optimism.

Supply
The approaches to the battlefield as far back as Poperinghe,  to the west, were under continual German artillery-fire and anywhere east of the Ypres–Yser Canal was impassable in daylight. Digging was the only protection from the German artillery and the area became a warren of dugouts and deep tunnels, continuously ventilated and pumped out. After 31 July, the British adapted captured German pillboxes and blockhouses but the weather quickly filled them with fœtid water from the corpses littering the area. The British guns fired more than ten million shells in August [] including most of the GHQ ammunition stock which, with the return fire of the German artillery, smashed the surface of the ground. On the Gheluvelt Plateau, the II Corps artillery fired  []. The nine rainy days of August 1917 was average for the month but the quantity of rain that fell was exceptional, flooding the churned ground and causing streams to overflow. Another  of ammunition was due to be dumped from the Pacific and Fuzeville railheads by the second week in September but many wagonloads had to be transported to the artillery lines and constant labour by engineers was necessary to maintain plank roads over the mud. After 31 July, loads had to be carried over the Steenbeek and a one-way system was instituted, once the plank roads had been extended about  closer to the new front line. Duckboards were easy to place, could be moved to avoid shell-fire and quickly repaired.

Casualties

Subsequent operations

To force the Germans to disperse their artillery-fire, the Second Army planned to attack on a  front from the Ypres–Comines canal to the Ypres–Roulers railway, with the Fifth Army continuing the attack north to the French First Army boundary. The British plan included more emphasis on the use of heavy and medium artillery to destroy German concrete pill-boxes and machine-gun nests, which were more numerous in the battle zones being attacked and to engage in more counter-battery fire. The Second Army corps on the Gheluvelt Plateau had  and medium and  guns and howitzers, more than double the quantity at the Battle of Pilckem Ridge.

Aircraft were to be used for systematic air observation of German troop movements to avoid the failures of previous battles, when too few aircrews had been burdened with too many duties and had often been grounded by bad weather. The counter-attacks failed to gain ground or made only a temporary penetration of the new British positions. The German defence had failed to defeat a well-prepared attack made in good weather.

Notes

Footnotes

References

Books
 
 
 
 
 
 
 
 
 
 
 
 
 
 
  Translation of Meine Tätigkeit im Weltkriege 1914–1918, Berlin, Verlag Ernst Siegfried Mittler und Sohn, 1939
 
 
 
 
 
 
 
 
 
 
 
 
 
 
 

Theses

Further reading
Books
 
 
 
 
 
 

Theses

External links

 Menin road photo essay

Conflicts in 1917
1917 in Belgium
Ypres Salient
Battles of World War I involving Belgium
Battles of the Western Front (World War I)
Battles of World War I involving Germany
Battles of World War I involving the United Kingdom
Battle of Passchendaele
July 1917 events
August 1917 events